Narvik University College merged with the University of Tromsø ( or ) from 1 January 2016 and is now named UiT - The Arctic University of Norway, campus Narvik. It has approximately 2000 students and 220 employees.

The campus offers bachelor's degrees in nursing, business and administration as well as engineering and various master's degrees in Technology. It also offers a PhD in technology.

References
 Narvik University College
 https://uit.no/sted/narvik

Universities and colleges in Norway
Education in Nordland
Educational institutions established in 1994
1994 establishments in Norway